Mukhang Bungo: Da Coconut Nut is a 1992 Philippine action comedy film written and directed by Felix E. Dalay on his directorial debut. The film stars Redford White, Shiela Ysrael, Willie Revillame, Dindo Arroyo, Berting Labra, Ruben Rustia, Gilda Aragon, Ernie Zarate, Moody Diaz, and Cris Daluz. The film's title is a parody of the 1991 film Markang Bungo: The Bobby Ortega Story, while its subtitle is taken from the song of the same name by Smokey Mountain. Produced by Moviestars Production, the film was released on May 14, 1992.

Critic Justino Dormiendo of the Manila Standard gave the film a negative review, criticizing the film's unfunny slapstick comedy and lack of smart satire for the 1992 Philippine election season.

Plot
Boboy Mortega is a stuntman living with his mother and father at the Take It or Leave It Cemetery. After his father is killed by thugs from a drug syndicate for being a police informer, Boboy takes a job as a security guard (colloquially called a "sikyu") and becomes a vigilante. With the help of his fellow policemen and a group of street children, Boboy tries to track down the syndicate as they have taken his father's body.

Cast

Redford White as Boboy Mortega
Shiela Ysrael as Miriam Salonga
Willie Revillame as Danding Mitra
Dindo Arroyo as Joseph Salvador
Berting Labra as Doy Ramos
Ruben Rustia as Jhonny Khadaphi
Gilda Aragon as Imelda Ortega
Ernie Zarate as Col. Fidel Estrada
Moody Diaz as Aling Kikay
Cris Daluz as Kikoy Ortega
Sigred Socrates as Nene
Jefferson Sy as Monching
Marty Manuel as Jovy
Renato del Prado as Bukas Kotse Gang member
Jimmy Reyes as Bukas Kotse Gang member
Danny Rojo as funeral manager
Bert Cayanan as Bukas Kotse Gang member
Pong Pong as Anito
Turling Pader as Benito
Ross Rival as Whitey
Dennis Duque as Blacky
Vic Belaro as Khadaphi's Bodyguard
Allan Garcia as Director
Jake Bais as Lawyer
Diana Lacson as Complainant
Josie Tagle as Talent Caretaker
Albert Garcia as Asst. Caretaker

Phillip Salvador cameos as "the actor".

Release
Mukhang Bungo was released in theaters on May 14, 1992.

Critical response
Justino Dormiendo of the Manila Standard gave Mukhang Bungo a negative review. He criticized the film's recycled and "mostly unfunny" slapstick comedy, the lack of clever satire for the 1992 Philippine election season, and the absence of "comic charm" among the cast, noting that the latter was usually the case with newer contemporary comedians in the Philippines. Dormiendo was also critical of White being "devoid of a strong comic persona that is most essential to the role", while adding that Berting Labra and Willie Revillame have no chemistry together in playing the patrolmen Ramos and Mitra respectively.

References

External links

1992 films
1992 action comedy films
Filipino-language films
Films about stunt performers
Philippine action comedy films
Philippine comedy films
Moviestars Production films
Films directed by Felix Dalay